The Society of London Art Dealers is an organization founded in 1932 for the promotion of dealers of fine art and antiquities in London. It is a founder member of the British Art Market Federation and a member of the Confédération Internationale des Négociants en Oeuvres d'Art (CINOA).

External links 
The Society of London Art Dealers

Arts organizations established in 1932
Arts organisations based in the United Kingdom
Associations of art dealers
Cultural organisations based in London
1932 in art
1932 establishments in England